The Party for Socialism and Liberation (PSL) has fielded candidates for local, state and national offices. Usually PSL candidates run as independents or as third party candidates (for instance the Peace and Freedom Party in California or the Green Party).

Presidential elections

Congressional elections

State elections

Local elections

References 

 
Communist parties in the United States